Kyle Martin Magennis (born 26 August 1998) is a Scottish professional footballer who plays as a midfielder for Scottish Premiership club Hibernian. He has also represented Scotland at under-17 and under-21 level.

Career

Club

St Mirren
Born in Glasgow, Magennis attended Paisley Grammar School. Magennis joined St Mirren's youth academy at the age of five and remained there throughout his youth career until making his debut for the senior team against Hibernian in October 2016, aged 18, in the Scottish Championship. He continued to appear for the club throughout the season, scoring his first goal for the club in a narrow win over Queen of the South. Having impressed manager Jack Ross with his performances, he was offered a new contract with St Mirren in December 2016 which extended his contract with the club until summer 2019.

Now established as a first team player in the Saints squad, Magennis signed a new contract committing him to the club until the summer of 2020, and after clinching the 2017–18 Scottish Championship title, he further extended his contract with St Mirren to 2021. He was in the side which secured their status in the Scottish Premiership via the relegation playoff in May 2019.

Magennis and Saints suffered a major blow in January 2020, when he injured his knee during a 1–0 defeat to Rangers, ending his season after having appeared in every match of the campaign until suffering the injury. In September 2020, St Mirren stated they had rejected a "substantial" offer for Magennis from Hibernian. A few days later another offer from the same club was accepted.

Hibernian
Magennis signed a five-year deal with Hibernian on 5 October 2020.

On 1 August 2021, Magennis scored Hibernian’s opening Scottish Premiership goal for the 2021–22 season against Motherwell which ended in a 3–2 victory for Hibs. Magennis had a good start to the 2021–22 season, but then missed most of it due to groin and knee injuries.

International 

Selected for the Scotland under-20 squad in the 2017 Toulon Tournament. The team went to claim the bronze medal. It was the nations first ever medal at the competition.

Having played at the 2017 Toulon Tournament, Magennis made his debut for the Scotland under-21 team in a 2–1 win against the Netherlands in September 2018.

Career statistics

References

External links
 
 
 

1998 births
Living people
Scottish footballers
People educated at Paisley Grammar School
Footballers from Glasgow
Association football midfielders
St Mirren F.C. players
Scottish Professional Football League players
Scotland youth international footballers
Scotland under-21 international footballers
Hibernian F.C. players